Kelly Jones and Rick Leach were the defending champions, but competed this year with different partners.

Jones teamed up with Paul Annacone and lost in the second round to Scott Davis and Jared Palmer.

Leach teamed up with Ken Flach and successfully defended his title, by defeating Glenn Michibata and David Pate 2–6, 6–3, 6–4 in the final.

Seeds
The first four seeds received a bye to the second round.

Draw

Finals

Top half

Bottom half

References

External links
 Official results archive (ATP)
 Official results archive (ITF)

1993 Japan Open Tennis Championships